German Plot may refer to:
 Christmas Day Plot, 1915; Indian conspiracy 
 German Plot (Ireland), 1918; putative conspiracy